Garry Lee Tonon (born September 12, 1991) is an American submission grappler and mixed martial artist. He is a five-time Eddie Bravo Invitational champion, and has won titles at ADCC submission wrestling championship, IBJJF World and Pan American championships.

He is known for his use of leglocks in submission-only grappling matches, and is a former member of the "Danaher Death Squad," a grappling team that was led by John Danaher at Renzo Gracie Academy.

While he still maintains a consistent submission grappling training schedule, since his debut in early 2018 Tonon has focused primarily on training and competing in professional mixed martial arts competition. He is an active fighter for the Singapore-based mixed martial arts promotion ONE Championship. He officially signed with the organization in October 2017. As of October 6, 2022, he is ranked #5 in the ONE Featherweight rankings.

Tonon has background in folkstyle wrestling, and is also a black belt in BJJ under Tom DeBlass & Ricardo Almeida, and is the head instructor of Brunswick BJJ in South Brunswick, New Jersey.

Early life
As a child, Tonon was identified as having ADHD by his mother, an employee of a non-profit organization for children with special needs. Tonon had his first introduction to grappling when he joined the wrestling team at his school in 5th grade. Tonon continued to wrestle for several more years, through his freshman year of high school. Tonon has credited wrestling & martial arts with helping him to cope with his ADHD, and partially attributes his particular style of grappling to the disorder. Tonon would also be later diagnosed with alopecia areata, a non-life threatening condition in which hair is lost from some or all areas of the body. He attended Lacey Township High School in Lacey Township, New Jersey, where he later graduated in 2009.

At age 14, a friend decided to bring Tonon to a local jiu-jitsu tournament, which interested Tonon. He soon began taking classes at his friend's jiu-jitsu academy, but lost interest after several months due to the school's focus on mixed martial arts, as opposed to jiu-jitsu. Shortly after leaving that school, Tonon found an advertisement for Tom DeBlass' academy, Ocean County Brazilian Jiu-Jitsu, and decided to continue his training there. While still attending high school, Tonon would consistently attend two classes per day at DeBlass' academy. DeBlass, noticing Tonon's interest in the sport, began bringing Tonon to Ricardo Almeida's academy for additional training.

Grappling career
In 2008, after about a year of consistent jiu-jitsu training with DeBlass and Almeida, Tonon won his first title at the IBJJF World Championships in the Blue Belt Juvenile Division. After graduating high school in 2009, Tonon began pursuing a degree in exercise science at Rutgers University. While studying at Rutgers, Tonon maintained a rigorous training schedule and continued to compete in both local and international competitions, mostly competing in the gi for the first 5 years of his training, but later beginning to seek out more specialized, no-gi instruction from John Danaher. He was awarded his black belt by Tom DeBlass and Ricardo Almeida in September 2013. One month later, Tonon went on to compete for the first time in the ADCC Submission Wrestling World Championship in Beijing, China, where he had matches with Kron Gracie, Marcus Almeida, Roberto "Cyborg" Abreu, and other well-known jiu-jitsu competitors.

From 2013 to 2017, Tonon went on to compete in numerous jiu-jitsu competitions as a black belt, including the IBJJF World & Pan American Championships, Eddie Bravo Invitational, Metamoris, Grapplers Quest, North American Grappling Association (NAGA), Kasai Grappling, Polaris Pro Grappling, ADCC Submission Wrestling World Championship, and others. His most notable wins include matches against AJ Agazarm, Joao Miyao, Dillon Danis, Ralek Gracie, and Vinny Magalhaes.

Tonon was booked to compete against Tye Ruotolo at ONE 157 on May 20, 2021 in a submission grappling match. Tonon was submitted with a D'arce choke and lost the match.

As a former medallist, Tonon was invited to compete at the 2022 ADCC World Championship. Prior to the event, Tonon decided to move down in weight to the under 66kg division. He lost on points to Sam McNally in the opening round and was eliminated from the tournament.

Mixed martial arts career

ONE Championship
In March 2018, Tonon made his professional mixed martial arts debut against Richard Corminal at ONE Championship: Iron Will, in Bangkok, Thailand. Tonon won the fight via TKO in the second round. Tonon had his second professional fight against Rahul Raju at ONE Championship: Reign of Kings on July 27, 2018. Tonon won the fight via rear naked choke in the third round. In November 2018, Tonon went on to fight Sung Jong Lee at ONE Championship: Heart of the Lion. Tonon won via guillotine choke in the second round.

On March 31, 2019, Tonon continued his winning streak and fought Anthony Engelen at ONE Championship: A New Era. Tonon won via TKO in the first round. In May, Tonon faced Yoshiki Nakahara at ONE Championship: Enter the Dragon He won the fight via a heel hook submission in the first round.

Garry Tonon was scheduled to face Koyomi Matsushima at ONE Championship: Inside the Matrix 4 on November 20, 2020. The bout was subsequently rescheduled for ONE Championship: Big Bang on December 4, 2020 and it was confirmed that he would have to compete without his coach, John Danaher, in his corner for the first time due to travel restrictions in place in Singapore. Tonon was unable to finish as Matsushima defended his submissions, but secured the unanimous decision victory to earn the first decision win of his mixed martial arts career.

Tonon was scheduled to face reigning champion Thanh Le for the ONE Featherweight Championship at ONE: X on December 5, 2021. In late October 2021, the promotion announced that the event was postponed due to the COVID-19 pandemic. His title fight with Le was rebooked for ONE: Lights Out on March 11, 2022. While attempting a heel hook, Tonon was caught by a hammer fist and lost by first-round knockout, handing him his first career MMA loss.

Tonon faced Johnny Nuñez on January 14, 2023, at ONE Fight Night 6. He won the fight via a kimura submission in the first round.

Championships and accomplishments

2020
  Jitsmagazine BJJ Awards Match of the Year  vs. Dante Leon.
2019
  ADCC 2019 World Championship (-77 kg)
2017
  Eddie Bravo Invitational 11 (-155 lbs)
  Polaris 5 (Superfight)
  ONE FC 55 (Superfight)
  Fight2Win Pro 28 (Superfight)
  Fight2Win Pro 24 (Superfight)
2016
  Studio 540 (Superfight)
  Eddie Bravo Invitational 9 (-205 lbs)
  Polaris 4 (Superfight)
  Grappling Pro (Superfight)
  Fight2Win Pro 8 (Superfight)
  Metamoris 7 (Superfight)
2015
  Eddie Bravo Invitational 5 (-155 lbs)
  Polaris 2 (Superfight)
  IBJJF Nogi Pan Championship (Absolute)
  IBJJF Nogi Pan Championship (-73.5 kg)
  FIVE Super League (Superfight)
  Grapplers Quest: All-Star Pro (-77 kg)
  Eddie Bravo Invitational 3 (-170 lbs)
  Polaris 1 (Superfight)
2014
  Metamoris 5 (Superfight)
  Metamoris 4 (Superfight)
  Eddie Bravo Invitational 1 (-170 lbs)

2012
  BJJ Kumite (Brown Belt Nogi)

Mixed martial arts record

|-
|Win
|align=center| 7–1 
|Johnny Nuñez
|Submission (kimura) 
|ONE Fight Night 6
|
|align=center| 1 
|align=center| 1:53
|Bangkok, Thailand
|
|-
|Loss
|align=center| 6–1
|Thanh Le 
|KO (punches)
|ONE: Lights Out
|
|align=center| 1 
|align=center| 0:56
|Kallang, Singapore
|
|-
|Win
|align=center| 6–0
|Koyomi Matsushima 
|Decision (unanimous) 
|ONE Championship: Big Bang
|
|align=center| 3
|align=center| 5:00
|Kallang, Singapore
|
|-
|Win
|align=center| 5–0
|Yoshiki Nakahara
|Submission (heel hook)
|ONE Championship: Enter the Dragon
|
|align=center| 1
|align=center| 0:55
|Kallang, Singapore
|
|-
|Win
|align=center| 4–0
|Anthony Engelen
|TKO (punches)
|ONE Championship: A New Era
|
|align=center| 1
|align=center| 4:12
|Tokyo, Japan
|
|-
|Win
|align=center| 3–0
|Sung Jong Lee
|Submission (guillotine choke)
|ONE Championship: Heart of the Lion
|
|align=center| 2
|align=center| 2:04
|Kallang, Singapore
|
|-
|Win
|align=center| 2–0
|Rahul Raju
|Submission (rear-naked choke)
|ONE Championship: Reign of Kings
|
|align=center| 3
|align=center| 3:27
|Manila, Philippines
| 
|-
|Win
|align=center| 1–0
|Richard Corminal
|TKO (punches and elbows)
|ONE Championship: Iron Will
|
|align=center| 2
|align=center| 3:40
|Bangkok, Thailand
|

Submission grappling record

{| class="wikitable sortable" style="font-size:80%; text-align:left;"
!  Result
!  Opponent
!  Method
!  Event
!  Division
!  Date
!  Location
|-
|Loss|| Tye Ruotolo  || Submission (D'Arce choke) || ONE 157||–77 kg|| May 20, 2022|| Kallang, Singapore
|-
|Win|| Dante Leon  || Referee Decision || WNO 3||Superfight|| August 1, 2020|| Austin, TX
|-
|Win|| Osvaldo Moizinho  || Submission (heel hook) || F2W 145||Superfight|| June 26, 2020|| Dallas, TX
|-
|Win|| Davi Ramos  || Referee Decision || F2W Pro 132||Superfight|| November 23, 2019|| Honolulu, HI
|-
|Loss|| Gordon Ryan  || Submission (rear naked choke) || rowspan=6|ADCC 2019||rowspan=2|Absolute||rowspan=2| September 29, 2019 ||rowspan=6| Anaheim, CA
|-
|Win|| Edwin Najmi || Submission (heel hook) 
|-
|Win|| Dante Leon  || Submission (heel hook) ||rowspan=4|-77 kg||rowspan=4| September 28, 2019 
|-
|Loss|| JT Torres || Points (2-0) 
|-
|Win|| Renato Canuto || Points (0-0) 
|-
|Win|| Mateusz Gamrot || Submission (rear naked choke) 
|-
|Loss|| Gianni Grippo  || Points (4-6) || rowspan=4|Kasai Pro||rowspan=4|-70 kg||rowspan=4| December 9, 2017 ||rowspan=4| Brooklyn, NY
|-
|Loss|| Renato Canuto  || Points (0-2)
|-
|Win|| AJ Agazarm  || Points (2-0)
|-
|Draw|| Mansher Khera  || Draw
|-
|Win|| Vagner Rocha  || Submission (heel hook) || rowspan=4|EBI 13||rowspan=4|-155 lbs|| rowspan=4|October 22, 2017 ||rowspan=4| Los Angeles, CA
|-
|Win|| Lucas Valente  || Submission (heel hook)
|-
|Win|| Ross Keeping  || Submission (armbar)
|-
|Win|| Chance Braud  || Submission (heel hook)
|-
|Loss|| Vagner Rocha  || Points (0-2) || rowspan=4|ADCC 2017||rowspan=4|-155 lbs|| rowspan=2|September 24, 2017 ||rowspan=4| Espoo
|-
|Loss|| Jonathan Torres  || Referee Decision 
|-
|Win|| Marcelo Mafra  || Penalty ||rowspan=2|September 23, 2017
|-
|Win|| Felipe Cesar  || Points (2-0)
|-
|Win|| Dillon Danis  || Judges Decision || Polaris 5||-81 kg|| August 19, 2017 || London
|-
|Win|| Shinya Aoki  || Submission (heel hook) || ONE 54||-81 kg|| May 26, 2017 || Singapore
|-
|Win|| Justin Rader  || Judges Decision || F2W Pro 28||Superfight|| March 24, 2017 || Oklahoma City, OK
|-
|Win|| AJ Agazarm  || Judges Decision || F2W Pro 24||Superfight|| February 3, 2017 || Huntington Beach, CA
|-
|Loss|| Antônio Carlos Júnior  || Submission (triangle choke) || Submission Underground 3||Superfight|| January 29, 2017 || Portland, OR
|-
|Win|| Kim Terra  || Submission (guillotine choke) || Studio 540||Superfight|| December 17, 2016 || Solana Beach, CA
|-
|Win|| Vinny Magalhães  || Fastest Escape || rowspan=4|EBI 9||rowspan=4|-205 lbs|| rowspan=4| November 7, 2016 ||rowspan=4| Los Angeles, CA
|-
|Win|| Daniel O'Brien  || Fastest Escape
|-
|Win|| Adam Sanchoff  || Submission (heel hook)
|-
|Win|| JJ Friedrich  || Submission (heel hook)
|-
|Win|| Gilbert Burns  || Submission (heel hook) || Polaris 4||Superfight|| October 29, 2016 || London
|-
|Win|| Enrico Cocco  || Submission {heel hook) || rowspan=3|Grappling Pro||rowspan=3|-77 kg|| rowspan=3| September 18, 2016 ||rowspan=3| Naples, FL
|-
|Win|| DJ Jackson  || Points (2-7) 
|-
|Win|| Hunter Ewald  || Technical Submission {injury)
|-
|Win|| Dustin Akbari  || Submission (heel hook) || F2W Pro 8||Superfight|| July 23, 2017 || San Francisco, CA
|-
|Win|| Ralek Gracie  || Submission (kneebar) || Metamoris 7||Superfight|| July 17, 2017 || Los Angeles, CA
|-
|Loss|| Yuri Simoes  || Fastest Escape || rowspan=2|EBI 6||rowspan=2|Absolute|| rowspan=2| April 24, 2016 ||rowspan=2| Los Angeles, CA
|-
|Win|| Felipe Fogolin  || Submission (heel hook)
|-
|Draw|| Rousimar Palhares  || Draw || Polaris 3||Superfight|| April 2, 2016 || Poole
|-
|Win|| Rafael Domingos  || Submission (heel hook) || rowspan=4|EBI 5||rowspan=4|-155 lbs|| rowspan=4|December 13, 2015 ||rowspan=4| Los Angeles, CA
|-
|Win|| Lachlan Gilles  || Submission (armbar)
|-
|Win|| Javier Vazquez  || Submission (heel hook)
|-
|Win|| Stephan Martinez  || Submission (bulldog choke)
|-
|Win|| Masakazu Imanari  || Submission (heel hook) || Polaris 2||Superfight|| September 12, 2015 || Cardiff
|-
|Loss|| Matheus Diniz  || Points (0-4) || rowspan=3|Nogi World Championships||rowspan=2|Absolute|| rowspan=3|November 8, 2015 ||rowspan=3| Long Beach, CA
|-
|Win|| Marcel Gonçalves  || Disqualification
|-
|Loss|| Michael Langhi  || Points (2-4) ||-73.5 kg
|-
|Loss|| Matheus Diniz  || Submission (wristlock) || rowspan=6|Nogi Pan Championships||rowspan=3|Absolute|| rowspan=6|October 3, 2015 ||rowspan=6| New York City, NY
|-
|Win|| Gianni Grippo  || Advantages
|-
|Win|| Washington Luis  || Submission (darce choke)
|-
|Win|| Rodrigo Freitas  || Points (7-2) ||rowspan=3|-73.5 kg
|-
|Win|| Renan Borges  || Submission (kneebar)
|-
|Win|| João Ferreira  ||Points
|-
|Loss|| Vinny Magalhães || Referee Decision || rowspan=3|ADCC 2015||Absolute|| September 30, 2015 ||rowspan=3| São Paulo
|-
|Loss|| Lucas Lepri || Points (0-10)||rowspan=2|-77 kg||rowspan=2|September 29, 2015
|-
|Win|| Dillon Danis || Submission (heel hook)
|-
|Win|| João Miyao  || Judges Decision || FIVE Super League||Superfight|| August 8, 2015 || New York City, NY
|-
|Win|| Rob Greenidge  || Submission (calf slicer) || rowspan=3|Grapplers Quest: All Star Pro||rowspan=3|-77 kg|| rowspan=3|June 6, 2015 ||rowspan=3| Edison, NJ
|-
|Win|| Joe Solecki  || Submission (heel hook)
|-
|Win|| Jordan Tabor  || Submission (guillotine choke)
|-
|Win|| Josh Hinger  || Fastest Escape || rowspan=4|EBI 3||rowspan=4|-170 lbs|| rowspan=4|March 22, 2015 ||rowspan=4| Los Angeles, CA
|-
|Win|| Eddie Cummings  || Submission (triangle armbar)
|-
|Win|| Karen Darabedyan  || Fastest Escape
|-
|Win|| Josh Valles  || Submission (heel hook)
|-
|Win|| Javier Vazquez  || Submission (triangle choke) || Gracie Nationals||Superfight|| February 8, 2015 || Los Angeles, CA
|-
|Win|| Marcin Held  || Submission (heel hook) || Polaris 1||Superfight|| January 10, 2015 || Cardiff
|-
|Win|| Zak Maxwell  || Submission (heel hook) || Metamoris 5||Superfight|| November 22, 2014 || Los Angeles, CA
|-
|Win|| Kit Dale  || Submission (guillotine choke) || Metamoris 4||Superfight|| August 9, 2014 || Los Angeles, CA
|-
|Win|| Richie Martinez  || Submission (heel hook) || rowspan=4|EBI 1||rowspan=4|-170 lbs|| rowspan=4|June 1, 2014 ||rowspan=4| Los Angeles, CA
|-
|Win|| Javier Valenciano  || Submission (heel hook)
|-
|Win|| Lance Glynn  || Submission (heel hook)
|-
|Win|| PJ Linder  || Submission (rear naked choke)
|-
|Loss|| Marcus Almeida  || Points || rowspan=4|ADCC 2013||rowspan=2|Absolute|| rowspan=2| October 20, 2013	 ||rowspan=4| Beijing
|-
|Loss|| Roberto Abreu  || Points 
|-
|Loss|| Kron Gracie  || Submission (rear naked choke) ||rowspan=2|-77 kg||rowspan=2| October 19, 2013	
|-
|Win|| Satoru Kitaoka  || Submission (rear naked choke) 
|-
|Loss|| Keenan Cornelius  || Submission (triangle choke) ||rowspan=19|BJJ Kumite(Brown Belt)|| rowspan=19|Absolute||rowspan=19|December, 2012||rowspan=19|Washington, D.C.
|-
|Win|| AJ Agazarm  || Submission (rear naked choke) 
|-
|Win|| AJ Agazarm  || Submission (shoulder lock) 
|-
|Win|| Wero Salazar  || Submission (kimura) 
|-
|Win|| Wero Salazar  || Submission (rear naked choke) 
|-
|Loss|| Sean Roberts  || Submission (armbar)  
|-
|Win|| Sean Roberts  || Submission (toe hold)  
|-
|Win|| Ilke Bulut  || Submission (rear naked choke)
|-
|Win|| Ilke Bulut  || Submission (toe hold)  
|-
|Win|| Luca Ancoreta  || Submission (heel hook) 
|-
|Win|| Luca Ancoreta  || Submission (rear naked choke) 
|-
|Loss|| AJ Souza  || Submission (armbar) 
|-
|Win|| AJ Souza  || Submission (rear naked choke) 
|-
|Win|| Darragh O'Conail  || Submission (rear naked choke) 
|-
|Loss|| Darragh O'Conail  || Submission (guillotine choke) 
|-
|Win|| Vitor Silveiro  || Submission (rear naked choke) 
|-
|Win|| Vitor Silveiro  || Submission (ankle lock) 
|-
|Loss|| Keenan Cornelius  || Submission (armbar) 
|-
|Loss|| Keenan Cornelius  || Submission (armbar)

See also
List of current ONE fighters

Notes

References

External links
 
 Garry Tonon at ONE Championship 
 
 
 
 
 

1991 births
American practitioners of Brazilian jiu-jitsu
Living people
American male mixed martial artists
Lacey Township High School alumni
Mixed martial artists from New Jersey
Mixed martial artists utilizing collegiate wrestling
Mixed martial artists utilizing Brazilian jiu-jitsu
People from Monroe Township, Middlesex County, New Jersey
Sportspeople from Lacey Township, New Jersey
American submission wrestlers
People awarded a black belt in Brazilian jiu-jitsu
Brazilian jiu-jitsu practitioners who have competed in MMA (men)